Manfred Heß is a former West German slalom canoeist who competed from the late 1960s to the early 1970s.

He won three medals in the C-2 team event at the ICF Canoe Slalom World Championships with a gold in 1969, a silver in 1971 and a bronze in 1967.

References
Overview of athlete's results at canoeslalom.net

German male canoeists
Living people
Year of birth missing (living people)
Medalists at the ICF Canoe Slalom World Championships